Australia competed at the 2006 Winter Olympics in Turin, Italy. The team of 40 athletes was the largest ever for Australia, surpassing the team of 31 that participated at the 1960 Winter Olympics.

Prior to the Olympics, Australia had set a goal of winning one medal. They were able to win two medals – one gold and one bronze – and had several other top 10 finishes.

Alisa Camplin served as flag bearer at the opening ceremonies.

Medalists

Alpine skiing 

Five Australian skiers competed in Turin, but only one, Craig Branch, finished a run. Branch was the first starter for the men's downhill, and his 32nd place was the highest finish for an Australian alpine skier since Calgary '88.

Note: In the men's combined, runs 1 is the downhill, and runs 2 and 3 are the slalom. In the women's combined, run 1 and 2 are the slalom, and run 3 the downhill.

Biathlon 

Cameron Morton, a primary school principal, and the only Australian biathlete in Turin, was aiming for a top-fifty finish, but failed to make the top 80 in either of his two events. He was the fifth Australian to compete in an Olympic biathlon.

Bobsleigh 

The men's pair of Rolleston and McKenzie equalled the best Australian finish in the event by placing 22nd, while Loch-Wilkinson and Reed were the first to represent the country in women's bobsleigh. Australia also attempted to enter a four-man team in Turin, appealing to the IOC and the CAS after it was revealed a Brazilian athlete had tested positive for nandrolone in a pre-Olympic test. The athlete in question had competed in a qualifying race won by Brazil, with New Zealand second and Australia third, with the top two teams advancing. The disqualification of the Brazilian entry from that race could have allowed Australia to compete, but the IOC, FIBT and CAS rejected the appeal.

Cross-country skiing 

Australia sent 3 skiers to compete in the cross country events, its largest contingent at a Winter Olympics.

Distance

Sprint

Figure skating 

Joanne Carter, who had placed 12th at the 1998 Olympics, finished 25th in the women's short program, failing to advance to the free skate.

Key: CD = Compulsory Dance, FD = Free Dance, FS = Free Skate, OD = Original Dance, SP = Short Program

Freestyle skiing 

Canadian-born Dale Begg-Smith entered the Games as the top ranked man in moguls, and won Australia's only gold medal in Turin. 2002 Winter Olympics gold medallist Alisa Camplin also won a medal, bronze in the women's aerials. This made her the first Australian athlete to win back-to-back medals in a winter sport. Camplin won a medal despite having major surgery on her knee four months before the Turin games. Jacqui Cooper set a world record in qualifying for the women's aerials, but ended up 8th in the final.

Men

Women

Luge 

Hannah Campbell-Pegg was the lone lugist representing Australia in Turin. She finished 23rd overall.

Short track speed skating 

Four years after Stephen Bradbury won a gold medal in short track, Australia's first, no Australian skater managed to advance to an A final. The best performance came from the men's relay, which won the B final to finish sixth.

Skeleton 

Michelle Steele, who was recruited to participate in the skeleton just 14 months before the Games, finished 13th in the women's event. Steele was part of a program created by the Australian Institute of Sport to develop Australian winter athletes by converting athletes from summer sports.

Snowboarding 

Nine snowboarders represented Australia across each of the three disciplines, but only one, Torah Bright qualified for a medal final. Bright was touted as a medal threat, and though she failed to qualify in the first round, she finished 1st in the second to make the final. She struggled in her first run of the final, ending up 10th, but improved to 5th after the second run.

Halfpipe

Note: In the final, the single best score from two runs is used to determine the ranking. A bracketed score indicates the run in the final that wasn't counted.

Parallel GS

Key: '+ Time' represents a deficit; the brackets indicate the results of each run.

Snowboard cross

See also 
 Australia at the 2006 Winter Paralympics
 Australia at the Winter Olympics

References

External links 
 Australian NOC
 Olympic Winter Institute of Australia
 Australian Olympic Committee: "2006 Australian Winter Olympic Team" PDF file 25 January 2006.

Nations at the 2006 Winter Olympics
2006
Winter Olympics
Winter sports in Australia